Doctor John Colin Gregory (28 July 1903 – 10 January 1959) was an amateur British tennis player, best remembered for winning the Australian Open in 1929.

Gregory was born in 1903 in Beverley, Yorkshire, the son of Dr William Herbert and Constance Gregory. Like his father, he became a medical doctor but was also a successful amateur lawn tennis player in both doubles and singles. Gregory also played cricket, golf, rugby and squash. In the 1920s he played doubles with Ian Collins and they were runners up at the 1929 Wimbledon Championships. In 1929 he won the Australian singles championship.

Following the Second World War, Gregory was captain of the British Davis Cup team. Due to an accident Geoffrey Paish was unable to play in a 1952 match against Yugoslavia and the 49-year-old Gregory stepped in to win the doubles match with Tony Mottram. Gregory became chairman of the All-England Club at Wimbledon in 1955, where he died in 1959 in the changing rooms following a match.

Grand Slam finals

Singles: 1 title

Doubles : 2 runners-up

References

Further reading
 Bud Collins (2003) Total Tennis - The Ultimate Tennis Encyclopedia, .

External links

 
 

Australian Championships (tennis) champions
English male tennis players
20th-century English medical doctors
Sportspeople from Beverley
1903 births
1959 deaths
Grand Slam (tennis) champions in men's singles
British male tennis players
Tennis people from the East Riding of Yorkshire